Florence Gravellier (born 23 January 1979) is a former French wheelchair tennis player. Gravellier is the 2005 and 2010 Australian Open doubles Champion. At the 2008 Paralympic Games in Beijing Gravellier was a double bronze medalist. Gravellier is a former world number one in the Women's doubles.

References

External links
 
 

1979 births
Living people
Tennis players from Bordeaux
Wheelchair tennis players
French female tennis players
Paralympic wheelchair tennis players of France
Paralympic medalists in wheelchair tennis
Paralympic bronze medalists for France
Wheelchair tennis players at the 2008 Summer Paralympics
Medalists at the 2008 Summer Paralympics
21st-century French people